Deipneus in Greek mythology is a demi-god of the preparation of meals, specifically the making of bread. He was revered in Achaea.

See also
 Ceraon
 Matton
 List of Greek mythological figures

References 

Greek gods